Gangeshwar Mahadev Temple is also known as Gangeshwar Mahadev or Gangeshwar Temple.It is a Hindu temple dedicated to Lord Shiva (Mahadeva) located at seashore of Fudam Village just 3 km away from Diu in the union territory of Dadra and Nagar Haveli and Daman and Diu. The view of the temple is unique set on the Arabian Sea. This is basically a cave temple situated in the midst of the rocks on the seashore. Once pilgrims enter the cave Lord Ganesha, Lord Vishnu, and Goddess Lakshmi can be sight then five  could visible in different sizes in middle of the sea water, this is the very significant feature of the temple and above the rock the Shiva Linga Seshanag was carved to look out for the Shiva Linga. These lingas are generally submerged in the sea during high tides and only during the low tides chance to visible. This temple is also known as 'Seashore Temple' as Shiva Linga is situated on the seashore.

History and legends of origin 
This temple is 5000 years old,   the establishment of temple and installation of five Lingas on rocky surface of  the sea shore  was done by five Pandav brothers (Yudhishthira, Bhima, Arjuna, Nakula and Sahadeva), while they were spending their anonymity in exile for worship of Lord Shiva on daily basis at the period of Mahabharata. The name Gangeshwar has been derived from Ganga and Iswar, it means the Lord of Ganga. Ganga was associated with Lord Shiva. When she was descending on the earth from heaven, it was Lord Shiva who held her waters in his jata to save the planet from her extreme current. Hence, Lord Shiva is also known as Gangadhar or Gangeshwar.

Five Shiva Linga 
The temple has five Shiva Linga installed by Pandava brothers depending on their individual sizes, the bigger one was made by (one of the brothers of Pandava’s) Bhima, as he had huge physique and subsequently.

Useful Information
Location: Fudam Village, Diu, Daman and Diu, India – 362520.
Best Time to Visit : from October to May
Timings to Visit : 6:00 am to 8:00 or 9:00 pm.
Nearest Railway Station : Delvada Railway Station at a distance of nearly 12.9 kilometres from Gangeshwar Temple.
Nearest Airport : Diu Airport , at a distance of nearly 6 kilometres from Gangeshwar Temple.

External links
 Gangeshwar Temple – Diu Tourism Department

References

Hindu temples in India
Padal Petra Stalam
Shiva temples in India
Buildings and structures in Dadra and Nagar Haveli and Daman and Diu
Diu district